Friends with Better Lives is an American sitcom television series created by Dana Klein. The multi-camera series premiered on CBS on March 31, 2014, as part of the 2013–14 American television season.

On May 10, 2014, CBS canceled the series after only five episodes had aired. Later that day, it was reported that Friends with Better Lives was being shopped to other networks. To date, eight of the thirteen episodes produced have aired.  The remaining five episodes were aired by DSTV in South Africa and were released on DVD in the US.

Plot
Six people all think their friends have better lives. Will (James Van Der Beek) is a newly-single bachelor pining for his ex-wife; Jules (Brooklyn Decker) and Lowell (Rick Donald) are newly engaged; Kate (Zoe Lister-Jones) is a successful, single career woman who does not have the best luck with dating; and Andi (Majandra Delfino) and Bobby (Kevin Connolly) are a happily married couple with one child and one on the way, pining for their younger fun days.

Cast
 James Van Der Beek as Will Stokes, a gynecologist who returns to the bachelor life after learning of his wife's infidelity
 Kevin Connolly as Bobby Lutz, a married man with two kids, who misses his young partying days
 Majandra Delfino as Andi Lutz, a married woman with two kids, who misses her young partying days
 Zoe Lister-Jones as Kate McLean, the Chief Operating Officer of a thriving social media company who doesn't have the best of luck when it comes to dating. The character's last name is mentioned as Piers in the episode "The Lost and Hound".
 Brooklyn Decker as Jules Talley, a former model and aspiring actress who recently became engaged to Lowell
 Rick Donald as Lowell Peddit, a spiritual, self-righteous, Australian environmentalist who is recently engaged to Jules

Production and development
In September 2012, Friends with Better Lives first appeared as part of the CBS development slate. On January 22, 2013, CBS placed a pilot order. The pilot was written by Dana Klein and directed by James Burrows.

Casting announcements began in February 2013, with James Van Der Beek first cast in the role of Will Stokes, a gynecologist who returns to the bachelor life after learning of his wife's infidelity. Brooklyn Decker was the next actor cast, in the series regular role of Jules Talley, a former model and aspiring actress who recently became engaged to Lowell. Rick Donald then joined the series as Lowell Peddit, a spiritual, self-righteous environmentalist who is recently engaged to Jules. Shortly after, Kevin Connolly and Majandra Delfino signed onto the series regular roles of Bobby and Andi Lutz, a happily married couple with two kids, who miss their young partying days. Zoe Lister-Jones was the last actor cast in the series regular role of Kate McLean, the Chief Operating Officer of a thriving social media company who doesn't have the best of luck when it comes to dating.

On May 12, 2013, CBS placed a series order on Friends with Better Lives to premiere as part of the 2013–14 American television season.

Episodes

Reception

On Rotten Tomatoes, the series has an aggregate score of 13% based on 3 positive and 21 negative critic reviews.  The website’s consensus reads: "With uninspired writing and a lack of chemistry between its leads, Friends With Better Lives is one you wouldn't wish on your worst enemy."

References

External links
 

2010s American sitcoms
2014 American television series debuts
2014 American television series endings
CBS original programming
English-language television shows
Television series by 20th Century Fox Television
Television series by Kapital Entertainment